Paratrixa is a genus of flies in the family Tachinidae.

Species
Paratrixa aethiopica Mesnil, 1952
Paratrixa flava (Shi, 1991)
Paratrixa pallida Mesnil, 1963
Paratrixa polonica Brauer & von Bergenstamm, 1891
Paratrixa stammeri Mesnil, 1952
Paratrixa takanoi Mesnil, 1970

References

Diptera of Asia
Diptera of Europe
Diptera of Africa
Exoristinae
Tachinidae genera
Taxa named by Friedrich Moritz Brauer
Taxa named by Julius von Bergenstamm